The Maaten al-Sarra Air Base is an airbase in southernmost Libya located near the Ma'tan as-Sarra oasis in the Kufra district. It is one of the 13 military airbases in Libya.

During the final phase of the Chadian-Libyan conflict, Maaten al-Sarra was the main air base in Southern Libya, being provided with three modern runways and an ample parking space that could support over 100 combat aircraft.

History

When in 1987 the Chadian army attacked Libyan positions in northern Chad, in the so-called Toyota War, after a string of victories the Chadians were defeated in August in the Battle of Aouzou, mainly due to Libyan airpower. The Chadian command decided that before renewing the offensive against the Aouzou Strip, it was vital to deal with the menace represented by the Libyan Air Force, and thus planned a surprise attack on Maaten al-Sarra, 60 miles north of the Chadian–Libyan border. The attack, which took place on September 5, was one of the most spectacular Chadian victories in the conflict, with 1,700 Libyans killed and 300 taken prisoner. The Chadian victory, because of Libyan demoralization at home and international hostility, brought an agreed ceasefire on September 11 that put an end to the war.

Current use

See also

Transport in Libya
List of airports in Libya

References

External links
OpenStreetMap - Matan As Sarra Air Base
Google Maps - Maaten al-Sarra

Libyan Air Force bases
Airports in Libya